Deep Sea Diver is a pop rock band based in Seattle, Washington. The band consists of Jessica Dobson (vocals, guitar, keys), Peter Mansen (drums), Elliot Jackson (guitar, synthesizer) and Garrett Gue (bass).

Biography
In 2009, Dobson recorded and released EP New Caves under the name Deep Sea Diver, accompanied by drummer and husband Peter Mansen.

The band's first full-length debut album, History Speaks, was self-released under their label High Beam Records in 2012 while Dobson was a touring member of The Shins. A second full-length album, Secrets, was self-published in 2016.

In April 2020, while under the COVID-19 lockdown, the band recorded and released a new single, "Stop Pretending".

The band's third full-length album, Impossible Weight, was voted KEXP Seattle Listeners' Top Album of 2020.

Discography

Albums
 History Speaks – 2012
 Secrets – 2016
 Impossible Weight – 2020

EP
 New Caves – 2009
 Always Waiting – 2014

Singles

References

Further reading

External links
 
 Recordings for NPR Music Live Sessions
 Deep Sea Diver on Discogs.com

American pop music groups
Rock music groups from Washington (state)
Musical groups from Seattle
ATO Records artists